The AACTA Award for Outstanding Achievement in Short Film Screen Craft is a special award, presented by the Australian Academy of Cinema and Television Arts (AACTA). The award was presented by the Australian Film Institute (AFI), from 2006 to 2010, at the Australian Film Institute Awards (known commonly as the AFI Awards).

Winners
In the following table, in 2006 winners are listed first, in boldface and highlighted in gold; those listed below the winner that are not in boldface or highlighted are the nominees; from 2007, onwards, the award was presented as a special award and those winners will be marked in a different colour.

See also
AACTA Awards

References

External links
The Australian Academy of Cinema and Television Arts Official website

Awards established in 2006
Short Film